The Cleburne Intermodal Transportation Depot is an Amtrak train station in Cleburne, Texas, United States.

History

For many years, Cleburne was the site of a major locomotive backshop of the Santa Fe Railroad, and many shop buildings can be seen on the east side of the track. The 1898 two-story brick depot was scaled down to one floor and ultimately demolished during the 1990s to make way for a road expansion project.

Cleburne became the northern end of the Trinity and Brazos Valley Railway in 1904, with the portion from Teague now abandoned.

Cleburne's current intermodal station, built in 1999, serves Amtrak trains and is the office for Cletran, the local bus transit. In recent history, the station has become less prestigious and the surrounding buildings have become mostly abandoned. The station is unstaffed, and all tickets must be purchased in advance.

References

External links

Amtrak Stations Database

Amtrak stations in Texas
Railway stations in the United States opened in 1999
Atchison, Topeka and Santa Fe Railway stations